Euphorbia bifurcata, commonly known as the forked spurge, is a species of plant in the family Euphorbiaceae native to Texas and New Mexico.

References 

bifurcata